Dynasty is an American drama television series reboot based on the 1980s prime time soap opera of the same name. Developed by Josh Schwartz, Stephanie Savage, and Sallie Patrick, the first season stars Elizabeth Gillies as Fallon Carrington, Grant Show as her father Blake Carrington, Nathalie Kelley as Blake's new wife Cristal, and James Mackay as his son Steven, with Robert Christopher Riley as chauffeur Michael Culhane, Sam Adegoke as tech billionaire Jeff Colby, Rafael de la Fuente as Sam "Sammy Jo" Jones, Cristal's nephew and Steven's love interest, and Alan Dale as Joseph Anders, the Carrington majordomo. 

The series later introduced Alexis Carrington (Nicollette Sheridan/Elaine Hendrix), Blake's and Jeff's ex-wife and the mother of Adam, Steven, Fallon and Amanda; Anders's daughter Kirby (Maddison Brown); Blake's third wife Cristal Jennings (Ana Brenda Contreras/Daniella Alonso); Blake and Alexis's long-missing son, Adam Carrington (Sam Underwood); Blake's half-sister Dominique Deveraux (Michael Michele), the mother of Jeff and Monica Colby (Wakeema Hollis); Fallon's husband Liam Ridley (Adam Huber); and Alexis's secret daughter by Blake, Amanda Carrington (Eliza Bennett).

The pilot, which was announced in September 2016, was ordered to series in May 2017. Dynasty premiered on October 11, 2017, on The CW in the United States, and on Netflix internationally a day later. On November 8, 2017, The CW picked up Dynasty for a full season of 22 episodes. On February 3, 2021, the series was renewed for a fifth season, which premiered on December 20 of the same year. In May 2022, it was announced that the fifth season would be its last. The final episode aired on September 16, 2022.

Premise
Fallon and Steven Carrington learn that their billionaire father Blake is engaged to Cristal, an employee at the family company. When Fallon's machinations to separate the couple backfire and cost her a promotion, she allies with Blake's nemesis and former employee, Jeff Colby, and strikes out on her own. Meanwhile, the arrival of Cristal's opportunistic nephew Sam—who becomes romantically involved with Steven—threatens to expose Cristal's shady past. The Carringtons form a united front in the wake of the suspicious death of Cristal's former lover, but things at the mansion do not remain harmonious for long. Later, more Carringtons return to Atlanta with agendas of their own, including Blake's ex-wife Alexis, Steven and Fallon's mother; Adam, Blake and Alexis's long-missing son; Dominique, Blake's half-sister and Jeff and Monica's mother; and Amanda, Alexis's fourth child with Blake whom she kept secret from him.

The reboot updates several elements from the 1980s original, including moving the setting from Denver, Colorado to Atlanta, Georgia; making Steven's homosexuality a nonissue to Blake; and changing gold digger Sammy Jo from a woman to a gay man. Additionally, in the new series, both Blake's new wife and her nephew are Latin American, and both chauffeur Michael Culhane and the Colby family are African-American.

Episodes

Cast and characters

Main
 Elizabeth Gillies as Fallon Carrington, an heiress and businesswoman, daughter of Blake Carrington and his first wife, Alexis, married to Liam Ridley
 Gillies also briefly portrays Alexis Carrington in season 2. 
 Nathalie Kelley as Celia Machado / Cristal Flores Carrington (season 1), Fallon's new stepmother, a woman with a shady past
 James Mackay as Steven Carrington (seasons 1–2; guest season 5), Fallon's gay environmentalist half-brother
 Robert Christopher Riley as Michael Culhane, former Carrington chauffeur and Fallon's on again-off again lover, who eventually amasses a fortune
 Sam Adegoke as Jeff Colby, a young business rival to Blake, eventually revealed to be his nephew
 Rafael de la Fuente as Samuel Josiah "Sammy Jo" Jones, Celia's wayward nephew and Steven's ex-husband
 Alan Dale as Joseph Anders (seasons 1–4), the Carrington majordomo, and Kirby and Steven's biological father
 Grant Show as Blake Carrington, billionaire CEO of Carrington Atlantic, and the father of Adam, Fallon and Amanda by his first wife, Alexis
 Nicollette Sheridan (recurring season 1, main season 2) and Elaine Hendrix (seasons 3–5), as Alexis Carrington Colby Dexter, Blake's and Jeff's ex-wife, Dex's wife and the mother of Adam, Steven, Fallon and Amanda
 Ana Brenda Contreras (season 2) and Daniella Alonso (seasons 3–5) as Cristal Jennings Carrington, Blake's third wife, a physical therapist from a South American crime family who had let Celia use her identity 
 Alonso also portrays Cristal's scheming look-alike, Rita, in season 5.
 Maddison Brown as Kirby Anders (seasons 2–5), Joseph's daughter, Steven's biological half-sister
 Sam Underwood as Adam Carrington / Dr. Mike Harrison (seasons 2–5), Blake and Alexis's eldest son, who was kidnapped as an infant
 Adam Huber as Liam Ridley (recurring seasons 1–2, main seasons 3–5), a writer who marries Fallon
 Michael Michele as Dominique Deveraux (recurring season 2, main seasons 3–5), Blake's half-sister and Jeff and Monica's mother
 Eliza Bennett as Amanda Carrington (recurring season 4, main season 5), Alexis's secret daughter by Blake, a lawyer raised in Europe and Kirby's love interest

Recurring

 Nick Wechsler as Matthew Blaisdel (season 1), Celia's former lover, a field engineer who dies in a suspicious explosion 
 Brianna Brown as Claudia Blaisdel (seasons 1–2; guest season 5), Matthew's wife, a former engineer 
 Wakeema Hollis as Monica Colby (seasons 1–3; guest season 4), Jeff's sister 
 Elena Tovar as Iris Machado (season 1; guest season 5), Celia's sister and Sam's mother 
 Michael Patrick Lane as Ted Dinard (season 1), Steven's ex-boyfriend 
 Arnetia Walker as Louella Culhane (seasons 1–2, 5), Michael's mother
 Luis Fernández as Alejandro Raya (season 1), Sam's father who is operating under the alias of Diego Calastana 
 Hakeem Kae-Kazim as Cesil Colby (seasons 1–2), Jeff and Monica's father 
 Kelly Rutherford as Melissa Daniels (seasons 1–3), wife of Senator Paul Daniels, and Steven's former lover 
 Elizabeth Youman as Evie Culhane (seasons 1–2), Michael's younger sister 
 Natalie Karp as Mrs. Gunnerson, the Carringtons' cook (guest seasons 1–3, 5)  
 Brent Antonello as Hank Sullivan (seasons 1–2), Alexis's lover who poses as her and Blake's kidnapped firstborn, Adam 
 Sharon Lawrence as Laura Van Kirk (season 2–5), Liam's controlling and manipulative mother 
 Katherine LaNasa as Ada Stone (season 2), an antiquities dealer who blackmails Michael and Jeff 
 Taylor Black as Ashley Cunningham (seasons 2–3), Liam's ex-girlfriend and Fallon's romantic rival 
 Chase Anderson as Tony (seasons 2–3), the Carringtons' dimwitted gardener who is blackmailed to do Alexis's bidding 
 Geovanni Gopradi as Roberto "Beto" Flores, Cristal's brother (season 5; guest seasons 2–4) 
 Nicole Zyana as Allison, Fallon's assistant (seasons 2–3) 
 Ken Kirby as Evan Tate (seasons 3; guest season 4), the older brother of Fallon's childhood friend Trixie 
 Kelli Barrett as Nadia (season 3), an orientation and mobility instructor hired by Fallon to make Adam fall in love with her 
 Jade Payton as Vanessa Deveraux (season 3), an aspiring singer who is Dominique's stepdaughter and Jeff and Monica's stepsister 
 Daniel Di Tomasso as Fletcher Myers (seasons 3–4), a public relations consultant who becomes Sam's love interest 
 Emily Rudd as Heidi (season 3), Liam's former girlfriend and the mother of his brother Connor 
 John Jackson Hunter as Connor (season 3), Liam's brother who he initially believes is his son 
 Wil Traval as Father Caleb Collins (season 3–4), Cristal's lover 
 Shannon Thornton as Mia (seasons 3–4), a college friend of Jeff's who becomes romantically entangled with both Jeff and Michael 
 Lachlan Buchanan as Ryan (season 4; guest seasons 3 and 5), a stripper Sam marries briefly, and then dates 
 Ashley Day as Colin McNaughton (season 4), Fallon's former enemy and business associate with whom she has an affair 
 Luke Cook as Oliver Noble (season 4), Kirby's Australian ex-boyfriend 
 David Aron Damane as Leo Abbott (season 4), a shady contractor 
 Kara Royster as Eva (season 4; guest season 5), Fallon's new assistant and protégé 
 Grace Junot as Ellen (season 5, guest season 4), a board member at Fallon Unlimited 
 Randy J. Goodwin as Brady Lloyd (season 4; guest season 5), Dominique's ex-husband 
 Felisha Terrell as Nina Fournier (season 5), an independent filmmaker and Culhane's love interest 
 Pej Vahdat as Dex Dexter (season 5), a hedge fund manager and old friend of Alexis who becomes her husband 
 Rogelio T. Ramos as Daniel Ruiz (season 5), a horse trainer who is Sam's biological father 
 Cynthia Quiles as Charlie Jiménez (season 5), a talent agent who signs and romances Kirby 
 Brett Tucker as Ben Carrington (season 5), Blake's estranged brother 
 Samantha Massell as Stacey Moore (season 5), a paleontologist who is Fallon and Liam's surrogate

Production

Development
In September 2016, it was announced that a reboot of the 1980s prime time soap opera Dynasty was in development at The CW, co-written by Josh Schwartz, Stephanie Savage, and Sallie Patrick. Savage said, "All of us have worked on shows that owe a huge debt to Dynasty, so it's kind of in our writing DNA to do this show." The trio discussed what they found unique and attractive about the original series, and how best to preserve those elements in an update. They also met with Richard and Esther Shapiro, the creators of Dynasty, who were ultimately attached as producers. Schwartz said, "We are definitely living in an age of dynasties. Whether it's the Trumps or the Clintons or the Kardashians or the Murdochs, our news is filled with the worlds of family dynasties and that was exciting for us." Savage added, "When we first sat down with the Shapiros to talk about rebooting the show, they talked a lot about family. No matter the villainous things that they did, they never stopped loving each other. I think we took that core concept and then just talked about how to place the idea in the historical context of our day." Patrick noted that the 1980s series was progressive for its time, dealing with issues like race, women in the workplace, and gay acceptance. She said, "We're trying to figure out how do we respect what that show was doing then and pushing it even farther in our version." De la Fuente said, "We're trying to make it stand on its own and be its own thing. But we have to pay homage to the original and the classic stuff that people remember from Dynasty, like the fashion, the catfights and the opulence of it all, is of course in our show. It wouldn't be Dynasty otherwise." Patrick said, "We really enjoy looking back through the old series and finding dramatic character-driven moments that they featured, but then making them our own and modernizing them. But at the same time, you can't do a reboot without making it your own, and I think over the course of the season, especially towards the end of the year, we started letting go a little bit more, and while there are a lot of Easter eggs for original viewers...and there are plot points that we've kind of rebranded...but we try not to tie ourselves too much to the old show, because sometimes that anchor can tie the show down."

The new series finds heiress Fallon Carrington facing off against her soon-to-be stepmother Cristal, a Hispanic woman. Patrick said, "It was important to me as a working woman to have two women fighting over the future of the dynasty." Schwartz said of the rival characters:

Patrick said, "We knew in our version—2017—we wanted Steven's conflict with Blake to be not about him being gay, but about him being liberal." Savage noted, "With Steven Carrington out and proud, it makes sense for Sammy Jo to be a man." Patrick said in August 2017 that Blake's first wife Alexis would be introduced during the first season, but that the role had yet to be cast. She noted, "We knew Alexis was coming before we even started shooting the pilot, which allowed us to pave the way for her ... throughout the season, we hear Blake, Steven, and Fallon's memories about the woman who abandoned their family. So by the time she actually enters the series, we've established expectations about her character—which Alexis will happily break." The role was cast with Nicollette Sheridan in November 2017, and she first appeared in episode 16 in March 2018.

The setting was also moved from Denver to Atlanta, in part because of Atlanta's diversity. Schwartz called the city "a realistic location of this family to be based out of", noting that the Shapiros had arbitrarily picked Denver for the original series and were not creatively attached to it. Patrick said of the change, "Denver was obviously chosen for a few solid reasons at the time, being one of the oil capitals ... For us, Denver didn't have the vibrancy and conflict that we needed." She said that Atlanta is "a super diverse population and a great mixture—where there's conflict between old money and new money." Kelley said, "This modern version represents a more current picture of what's happening in America. The diversity of the cast really represents that." In the update, chauffeur Michael Culhane and the Colby family are African-American. Also, Cristal's Venezuelan origins will allow the show to explore the current geopolitics of that country.

Patrick said that episode seven, "A Taste of Your Own Medicine", "brings to a head so many of the stories that we've been slowly building. It hits the tone of the show perfectly." She added:

The episode titles are lines of dialogue from the original series. In addition to reworked characters and plotlines, the reboot contains multiple visual homages to the 1980s series, including props and wardrobe.

Casting

Nathalie Kelley was cast as Cristal in January 2017, followed by Elizabeth Gillies as Fallon, Sam Adegoke as playboy Jeff Colby, and Robert Christopher Riley as Blake's chauffeur Michael Culhane in February. Next cast were Grant Show as Fallon's father Blake Carrington, and Rafael de la Fuente as Sam Jones, a gay male version of the original series' Sammy Jo Carrington, in March. The remaining main cast members are James Mackay as Fallon's gay brother Steven, and Alan Dale as Carrington majordomo Anders. Additional recurring performers include Nick Wechsler as Cristal's ex-lover Matthew Blaisdel, Brianna Brown as Matthew's wife Claudia, Wakeema Hollis as Jeff's sister Monica Colby, and Adam Huber as Liam Ridley, Fallon's new husband. In November 2017, Nicollette Sheridan was cast in the role of Blake's ex-wife Alexis Carrington, and was later promoted to series regular status for season two. Other guest stars include Elena Tovar as Iris Machado, Cristal's sister and Sam's mother; Bill Smitrovich as Thomas Carrington, Blake's estranged father; and Hakeem Kae-Kazim as Cesil Colby, Jeff and Monica's father.

In June 2018, Kelley told E! News that she would not be returning for season two. She later said, "I think I wasn't up to the challenge of a nighttime soap ... I think the best thing they felt they could do is start afresh." The CW announced in August 2018 that Ana Brenda Contreras had been cast as "the real Cristal Flores" for the second season. Maddison Brown was also cast as Anders's daughter, Kirby. A May 2018 press release teased that the show would introduce Blake's half-sister Dominique Deveraux, Jeff and Monica's mother, in season two. In November 2018, The CW confirmed that Mackay would no longer be a series regular after the first four episodes of season two, but would return later in the season. The CW announced on February 25, 2019, that Sheridan would be leaving Dynasty to focus on "some personal family responsibilities." Sheridan said in her own statement that she was leaving to spend more time with her terminally ill mother in Los Angeles. She last appeared in the episode "Motherly Overprotectiveness". In March 2019, Sam Underwood began appearing as Blake and Alexis's kidnapped eldest child, Adam. Elizabeth Gillies, who was already playing Fallon on the show, took over the role after Sheridan's departure near the end of the second season. Her three-episode portrayal was a temporary recast to give producers time to find a suitable replacement for Sheridan. On March 22, 2019, it was announced that Michael Michele had been cast as Blake's half-sister Dominique. Michele first appeared in "New Lady in Town".

In July 2019, it was announced that Contreras would not be returning for season three for personal reasons, and that Daniella Alonso would take over the role of Cristal. On October 11, 2019, it was announced that recurring performers Adam Huber and Michael Michele had been promoted to series regulars. On October 28, 2019, it was announced that the role of Alexis had been recast with Elaine Hendrix, who would appear as a series regular. Original cast member Dale's character was killed off in the August 2021 episode  "Go Rescue Someone Else". The casting of Eliza Bennett as Alexis's secret daughter by Blake, Amanda Carrington, was announced in August 2021. In January 2022, it was reported that Pej Vahdat had been cast as Dex Dexter for season five.

Filming
The pilot was filmed in Atlanta. On May 10, 2017, the Dynasty reboot received a series order at The CW. A preview trailer was released on May 18, 2017. Dynasty premiered on The CW in the United States on Wednesday, October 11, 2017, and on November 8, 2017, The CW picked up the series for a full second season of 22 episodes. Sheridan's casting was a key factor in the decision to give Dynasty a back nine order of episodes after the initial 13. On April 2, 2018, The CW renewed the series for a second season, which premiered on October 12, 2018. Dynasty was renewed for a third season on January 31, 2019, which premiered on October 11, 2019. In May 2019, Deadline Hollywood reported that co-executive producer Josh Reims would succeed Sallie Patrick as executive producer and showrunner for season three. On January 7, 2020, Dynasty was renewed for a fourth season, which premiered on May 7, 2021.

Production of Dynasty was suspended in March 2020 as a direct result of the COVID-19 pandemic. Filming of only twenty of the twenty-two ordered episodes of the third season had been completed at that time. Gillies said, "So there is no finale at this juncture, and there is no episode before the finale. So it ends in a very weird place ... I don't know if we'll pick up the finale later, I'm not sure what the plan is. It certainly shouldn't end on the episode we finished, because it's just really random and nothing’s resolved. I apologize if it does." It was later confirmed that the 20th episode of the season, "My Hangover's Arrived", would serve as the season finale, though it has not been announced whether the remaining two episodes of the season will be produced later. It was reported that if production resumed by late fall 2020, season four would be expected to premiere in spring 2021 or later, and The CW's president Mark Pedowitz announced that all of the network's series would be producing "our normal episodic counts" for the post-pandemic season. Production on the fourth season officially began on October 15, 2020. On February 3, 2021, ahead of its fourth season premiere, The CW renewed the series for a fifth season, which premiered on December 20, 2021. Filming for season five took place between October 22, 2021 to August 2, 2022. On May 12, 2022, The CW announced the fifth season would be Dynasty last .

Music
The pilot includes a flashback of a young Steven playing the original Dynasty theme by Bill Conti on piano. An updated, 15-second version debuted as an opening credits sequence in the 1980s-themed third episode, "Guilt is for Insecure People", but is only used in some episodes. Composer Paul Leonard-Morgan worked with Troy Nõka to get "an '80s-rock vibe" for the song, to match Leonard-Morgan's soundtrack for the series. The new theme was recorded with an orchestra at Capitol Records in Hollywood, featuring Los Angeles Philharmonic lead trumpet player Tom Hooten.

In the season two premiere "Twenty-Three Skidoo",  Gillies sings a 1920s version of "Bizarre Love Triangle" by New Order. In the season three episode "Something Desperate", Fallon hallucinates four musical numbers, sung by Gillies, Underwood, Show, Alonso, and De la Fuente.

In the season four episode "Vows Are Still Sacred", Gillies sings "More Than Me", a song she wrote in collaboration with her husband, Michael Corcoran. A studio version of "More Than Me" was released on the Lakeshore Records YouTube channel on May 18, 2021, and on digital music platforms on May 21, 2021.

Broadcast
Dynasty premiered on The CW in the United States on Wednesday, October 11, 2017, with the season two premiere of Riverdale as its lead-in. The series moved to Fridays starting with the fourteenth episode. Season two began airing on October 12, 2018, and season three premiered on October 11, 2019. Season four premiered on May 7, 2021, and season five premiered on December 20, 2021. The final episode aired on September 16, 2022. Each full season is released on Netflix in the US several days after the season finale airs.

Netflix acquired exclusive international broadcast rights to Dynasty, making episodes available as an original series on the platform less than a day after their original US broadcast in seasons one and two. Unlike previous seasons, the full third season was released globally on Netflix on May 23, 2020, a few weeks after the season finale.

Les Moonves, the then-head of CBS Corporation, said in 2017, "We own 100 percent of [Dynasty], and we've already licensed it to Netflix in 188 countries ... So this means Dynasty is profitable before it even hits the air." Pedowitz said in January 2018, "I'm disappointed in the ratings, I wanted it to do more, but I'm happy with the production values that Josh, Steph and Sallie are doing. There are changes coming, I'm thrilled to have Nicollette [Sheridan] ... I'm looking forward to Nicollette and Liz [Gillies] really going at it as a mother-daughter situation, and I think that will add some juice to the show."

In 2022, executive producer Josh Reims admitted that, due to the international success of Dynasty on Netflix, "there was literally no discussion about the ratings ever, which is great." Regarding The CW's marketing of Dynasty, "I don't think it mattered. I think people were just waiting for it to drop on Netflix. Online, people were asking when's the show starting on Netflix. So it felt like by season three, at least there was already a built-in audience."

Reception

Ratings

Critical response 
The review aggregator website Rotten Tomatoes's consensus reads, "Dynastys revival retains enough of its predecessor's over-the-top allure to offer a glamorous guilty pleasure in its first season, even if it never quite recaptures the magic of the original." The website reported a 49% approval rating with an average rating of 6.54/10 based on 47 reviews for season one. The website's Metacritic, which uses a weighted average, assigned a score of 52 out of 100 based on 17 critics, indicating "mixed or average reviews". Chris Harnick of E! Online called the pilot "soapy and fun", adding that the series is "a worthy heir to the original show and Josh Schwartz and Stephanie Savage's previous offering Gossip Girl and The O.C.". Adweek called the pilot inferior to Gossip Girl and the original Dynasty, but suggested that its pairing with Riverdale "could provide audiences a guilty-pleasure double-feature". Tierney Bricker of E! Online dubbed Kelley "this season's breakout star", with Gillies "hot on her Louboutin heels". However, many critics claimed that there were not enough soap opera vibes in the reboot compared to the original.

For season two, some critics found the continuing series to be more of a soap opera and more intriguing.

Awards and nominations

Home media

References

External links
 
 

 
2010s American LGBT-related drama television series
2017 American television series debuts
2022 American television series endings
2020s American LGBT-related drama television series
American primetime television soap operas
American television soap operas
The CW original programming
English-language television shows
Gay-related television shows
Mass media portrayals of the upper class
Serial drama television series
Television series about dysfunctional families
Television series by CBS Studios
Television series reboots
Television shows filmed in Atlanta
Television shows set in Atlanta
Works about petroleum